The 1967–68 Idaho Vandals men's basketball team represented the University of Idaho during the 1967–68 NCAA University Division basketball season. Charter members of the Big Sky Conference, the Vandals were led by second-year head coach Wayne Anderson and played their home games on campus at the Memorial Gymnasium in Moscow, Idaho. They were 15–11 overall and 9–3 in conference play.

References

External links
Sports Reference – Idaho Vandals: 1967–68 basketball season
Gem of the Mountains: 1968 University of Idaho yearbook – 1967–68 basketball season
Idaho Argonaut – student newspaper – 1968 editions

Idaho
Idaho Vandals men's basketball seasons
Idaho Basketball, Men's
Idaho